Matej Jelić (born 5 November 1990) is a Croatian professional footballer who most recently played as a forward for Cibalia.

Club career

MŠK Žilina
Jelić joined MŠK Žilina in the summer of 2013. On 28 July 2013, he scored a goal on his competitive debut for Žilina in a 3–1 league victory over FC ViOn Zlaté Moravce. In the 2014–15 season, Jelić became the league's joint top scorer (alongside Jan Kalabiška) with 19 goals. Overall, he scored 29 goals for MŠK Žilina in 67 league appearances, he also added 8 goals in the qualifying rounds of the UEFA Europa League.

SK Rapid Wien
On 31 August 2015, official website of MŠK Žilina announced departure of Matej Jelić to Austrian side SK Rapid Wien. He signed a four-year contract until the summer of 2019.

HNK Rijeka (loan)
On 21 July 2017, Jelić was loaned to HNK Rijeka until the end of the season, with a buying option.

Club statistics

References

External links

MŠK Žilina profile 

1990 births
Living people
People from Našice
Association football forwards
Croatian footballers
NK Belišće players
GNK Dinamo Zagreb players
NK Lokomotiva Zagreb players
NK Lučko players
NK Karlovac players
NK Rudeš players
MŠK Žilina players
SK Rapid Wien players
HNK Rijeka players
NK Slaven Belupo players
Bruk-Bet Termalica Nieciecza players
FK Radnik Bijeljina players
HNK Cibalia players
Croatian Football League players
First Football League (Croatia) players
Slovak Super Liga players
Austrian Football Bundesliga players
I liga players
Premier League of Bosnia and Herzegovina players
Croatian expatriate footballers
Expatriate footballers in Slovakia
Expatriate footballers in Austria
Expatriate footballers in Poland
Expatriate footballers in Bosnia and Herzegovina
Croatian expatriate sportspeople in Slovakia
Croatian expatriate sportspeople in Austria
Croatian expatriate sportspeople in Poland
Croatian expatriate sportspeople in Bosnia and Herzegovina